The 1982 Cork Senior Football Championship was the 94th staging of the Cork Senior Football Championship since its establishment by the Cork County Board in 1887. The draw for the opening round fixtures took place on 31 January 1982. The championship began on 24 April 1982 and ended on 24 October 1982.

Nemo Rangers entered the championship as the defending champions, however, they were beaten by Duhallow at the quarter-final stage.

On 24 October 1982, St. Finbarr's won the championship following a 3-08 to 1-09 defeat of University College Cork in the final. This was their 7th championship title overall and their first title since 1980.

Clonakilty's Eoin O'Mahony was the championship's top scorer with 2-22.

Format change

The championship returned to a knock-out format after a one-year experiment of separating the city, rural and divisional teams.

Results

First round

Second round

Quarter-finals

Semi-finals

Final

Championship statistics

Top scorer

Overall

In a single game

Miscellaneous

 St. Finbarr's achieved the double for only the second time in their history.

References

Cork Senior Football Championship
1982 in Gaelic football